Liechtenstein competed at the 2020 Summer Olympics in Tokyo. Originally scheduled to take place from 24 July to 9 August 2020, the Games were postponed to 23 July to 8 August 2021 because of the COVID-19 pandemic. Since the nation's official debut in 1936, Liechtensteiner athletes have appeared in every edition of the Summer Olympic Games, except for two occasions; Liechtenstein did not register any athletes at the 1956 Summer Olympics in Melbourne, and eventually joined the United States-led boycott when Moscow hosted the 1980 Summer Olympics.

Competitors
The following is the list of number of competitors participating in the Games:

Artistic swimming

For the first time in Olympic history, Liechtenstein fielded a squad of two artistic swimmers to compete in the women's duet event, by finishing eighth and securing seventh of the eight available spots at the 2021 FINA Olympic Qualification Tournament in Barcelona, Spain.

Judo

Liechtenstein qualified one judoka for the men's middleweight category (90 kg) at the Games, marking the nation's return to the sport for the first time in two decades. Raphael Schwendinger accepted a continental berth from Europe as the nation's top-ranked judoka outside of direct qualifying position in the IJF World Ranking List of June 28, 2021.

Swimming 

Liechtensteinian swimmers further achieved qualifying standards in the following events (up to a maximum of 2 swimmers in each event at the Olympic Qualifying Time (OQT), and potentially 1 at the Olympic Selection Time (OST)):

References

Nations at the 2020 Summer Olympics
2020
2021 in Liechtenstein sport